The Grand Army of the Republic Memorial Hall is an historic building located at 1101 Massachusetts Avenue in St. Cloud, Florida, in the United States. The city of St. Cloud had been founded by the Grand Army of the Republic or GAR,  as a retirement colony for its members. The hall was built in 1914 by members of the GAR as a memorial to the Union Army veterans of the Civil War. It was one of many such halls built in the country.  On February 21, 1997, it was added to the U.S. National Register of Historic Places.

National Register listing
Grand Army of the Republic Memorial Hall ** (added 1997 - Building - #97000097)
Also known as G.A.R. Memorial Hall
1101 Massachusetts Ave., St. Cloud
Historic Significance: Event, Architecture/Engineering
Architect, builder, or engineer: 	Chessman, M.W.
Architectural Style: 	Early Commercial
Area of Significance: 	Architecture, Community Planning And Development, Social History
Period of Significance: 	1900–1924, 1925–1949
Owner: 	Private
Historic Function: 	Social
Historic Sub-function: Meeting Hall
Current Function: 	Commerce/Trade, Recreation And Culture
Current Sub-function: 	Museum, Professional

Meetings
The hall was the meeting place of the Lucius L. Mitchell GAR Post No. 34, which was named for the first Union veteran to die in the St. Cloud colony, and which was one of 34 GAR posts in Florida. It is now the meeting place of the Lucius L Mitchell Camp No. 4 of the Sons of Union Veterans of the Civil War, the successor organization to the Grand Army of the Republic.

See also
National Register of Historic Places listings in Florida
Grand Army of the Republic Hall (disambiguation)
Sons of Union Veterans of the Civil War

References

External links

 Lucius L. Mitchell Camp #4, Sons of Union Veterans of the Civil War website
 Florida GAR Posts
 Osceola County listings at National Register of Historic Places
 Grand Army of the Republic Memorial Hall at Florida's Office of Cultural and Historical Programs
 St. Cloud Heritage Museum located nearby 
 St. Cloud history

Clubhouses on the National Register of Historic Places in Florida
Florida
Buildings and structures in Osceola County, Florida
St. Cloud, Florida
National Register of Historic Places in Osceola County, Florida
1914 establishments in Florida
Buildings and structures completed in 1914